Pullampara  is a village, near Thiruvananthapuram city in Thiruvananthapuram district in the state of Kerala, India.

Demographics
 India census, Pullampara had a population of 22452 with 10730 males and 11722 females,
There are so many arts and sports clubs situated in Pullampara.

Achievements
Pullampara grama panchayat recently finished ‘Digi Pullampara’, a campaign to ensure total digital literacy among the people of the panchayat.The panchayat trained around 4,500 people from fifteen wards of around age group from 14 to 65.Now Pullampara has been selected as India's first fully digital literate panchayat.

Attractions
The main attractions of this place are Meenmood waterfalls, Vengamala Devi Temple and Louis view point etc:- Also this place has a small public stadium near Pullampara Krishi bhavan.

References

Villages in Thiruvananthapuram district